Santa Teresa seven-a-side is an annual club rugby sevens tournament in Venezuela. It is organised by the Fundación Santa Teresa and it has the support of the Venezuelan Rugby Federation. Venezuelan and foreign teams compete in the following categories: Men, Women and Junior (Under-18). The matches are played on a rugby pitch located at Hacienda Santa Teresa, a sugarcane plantation next to El Consejo, in Aragua State.

History 
The tournament was founded in 1993. It was originally organised by the Club de Rugby de la Universidad Metropolitana.  Since 2008, Fundación Santa Teresa is in charge of the competition.

Champions

See also
 Rugby union in Venezuela

References

Rugby union in Venezuela